The 2017–18 Kennesaw State Owls men's basketball team represented Kennesaw State University during the 2017–18 NCAA Division I men's basketball season. The Owls were led by third-year head coach Al Skinner and played their home games at the KSU Convocation Center on the university's campus in Kennesaw, Georgia as members of the Atlantic Sun Conference. They finished the season 10–20, 6–8 in ASUN play to finish in sixth place. They lost in the quarterfinals of the ASUN tournament to Jacksonville.

Previous season
The Owls finished the 2016–17 season 14–18, 7–7 in ASUN play to finish in a tie for fourth place. As the No. 5 seed in the ASUN tournament, they defeated USC Upstate before losing to Florida Gulf Coast in the semifinals.

Offseason

Departures

Incoming transfers

2017 recruiting class

Roster

Schedule and results

|-
!colspan=9 style=| Exhibition

|-
!colspan=9 style=| Non-conference regular season

|-
!colspan=9 style=| Atlantic Sun Conference regular season

|-
!colspan=9 style=| Atlantic Sun tournament

References

Kennesaw State Owls men's basketball seasons
Kennesaw State